Olearia macrodonta (mountain holly or arorangi in New Zealand, or New Zealand holly elsewhere) is a small sub-alpine evergreen tree endemic to New Zealand, from the plant family Asteraceae. It is closely related to the narrow-leaved Olearia ilicifolia, with which it shares several characteristics including largely undulating and serrated grey-green leaves. These common characteristics mean the two species are often confused with one another.

Its daisy-like composite flowers are white with yellow centres and grow in large, rounded, much-branched corymbs.

Despite its common name, O. macrodonta is not closely related to the true hollies Ilex. The specific epithet macrodonta means "large-toothed", referring to the leaves.

This plant has gained the Royal Horticultural Society's Award of Garden Merit.

References

External links 

Flora of New Zealand
macrodonta
Plants described in 1864
Taxa named by John Gilbert Baker